Liam Tallon (born 8 November 1986), better known by his stage name Draft, is a British electronic music producer, DJ and songwriter.

Biography
On 9 May 2012, Liam Tallon was invited to perform on Goldie's Metalheadz Podcast, signalling his first live recorded audio performance after a string of self-released internet tracks. Following the feedback, he was then asked by Goldie to join 3 other Metalheadz artists in playing for the Boiler Room (music project) on 22 May 2012, which was his first live broadcast performance.
 
Tallon released The Phryday EP on AEI Media owned label, Pilot Records, in 2014. Later that year, he released another two EP's on Pilot Records, Makeshift Constellations EP and Pillage EP.
 
In 2015, Tallon signed his first release with mau5trap via the We Are Friends, Vol. 4 compilation, as well as curating the promotional mix for the commercial release. In 2016, he released his first full EP on mau5trap, titled Left Behind, before again featuring on mau5trap's artist compilation We Are Friends, Vol. 5, where he once again curated the promotional mix. In October 2016 he released From Inside, again on mau5trap, with the track Bishop Takes King being featured in the online documentary Legends Rising, from League of Legends. In November 2016, he was awarded the status of Power User by Image-Line for his use of their flagship software, FL Studio. Tallon finished off a strong 2016 by contributing a track to mau5trap's new compilation series Foar Moar: Vol. 1, with Izumi. In 2017, Tallon contributed to mau5trap's We Are Friends, Vol.6 with Eyes Shut, where he again curated the promotional mix for the commercial release, before releasing his eagerly anticipated 6-track EP titled Patience & Time, again on mau5trap. In October 2017, British duo Anavae released their EP Are You Dreaming?, which featured Lose Your Love, co-written by Tallon. Tallon spent 2018 songwriting and producing for other artists, including Isabel Higuero, in which he co-wrote and produced two tracks under his moniker LJT Music

His musical influences range from Heavy Metal to Classical music. Appearing on the landmark 10th episode of the Limitless Vibrations Podcast, Tallon slated 2019 as the year he would release his debut LP, in addition to a downtempo EP, which would be a return to his original production style.

The 6-track EP Grimy Scraps was released in April 2019, via Tallon’s newly created label, DRFT, in conjunction with AWAL, part of Kobalt Music Group. In late December 2019, Tallon wrapped off the year with the single release of Saviour, a track taken off his forthcoming album

Discography

Extended plays

Songwriting credits

Production credits

Remixes

References

External links 
 Draft

1986 births
21st-century English musicians
Dubstep musicians
English DJs
English drum and bass musicians
Irish DJs
Irish drum and bass musicians
Living people
Musicians from Essex
Mau5trap artists
Electronic dance music DJs